A Big Hand for the Little Lady (released in the UK under the misleading title Big Deal at Dodge City, as the film is set in Laredo, Texas) is a 1966 American Western film made by Eden Productions Inc. and released by Warner Bros. The film was produced and directed by Fielder Cook from a screenplay by Sidney Carroll, adapted from their TV play Big Deal in Laredo which aired on The DuPont Show of the Week in 1962.

The film stars Henry Fonda, Joanne Woodward, and Jason Robards. The original TV play starred Walter Matthau as Meredith.

Plot
The five richest men in the territory gather in Laredo for their annual high-stakes poker game. The high rollers let nothing get in the way of their yearly showdown. When undertaker Tropp (Charles Bickford) calls for them in his horse-drawn hearse, cattleman Henry Drummond (Robards) forces a postponement of his daughter's wedding, while lawyer Otto Habershaw (Kevin McCarthy) abandons his closing arguments in a trial, with his client's life hanging in the balance. They are joined by Wilcox (Robert Middleton) and Buford (John Qualen) in the back room of Sam's saloon, while the curious gather outside for occasional reports.

Settler Meredith (Fonda), his wife Mary (Joanne Woodward), and their young son Jackie (Gerald Michenaud) are passing through, on their way to purchase a farm near San Antonio, when a wheel on their wagon breaks. They wait at Sam's while the local blacksmith repairs it. Meredith, a recovering gambler, learns of the big poker game and begins to feel the excitement once again. The newcomer buys into the game, eventually staking all of the family savings, meant to pay for a home.

The game builds to a climactic hand; the gamblers raise and reraise until more than $20,000 are in the pot. Meredith, out of cash, is unable to call the latest raise. Under the strain, he collapses. The town physician, Joseph "Doc" Scully (Burgess Meredith), is called to care for the stricken man. Barely conscious, Meredith signals for his wife to play out the hand.

Taking his seat, Mary asks, "How do you play this game?" At this, the other players object loudly, but eventually give in. The situation is explained to her; if she cannot match the last raise (and any others that may follow), she will be out of the hand.

Despite the men's protests, she leaves the room to borrow additional funds. With Jackie and four of the players trailing behind, Mary crosses the street and talks to the owner of the Cattle and Merchants' Bank, C. P. Ballinger (Paul Ford). After she shows him her hand, Ballinger suggests she is playing a practical joke. When he is told otherwise, he lends her $5,500 (at 6% interest) and makes a $5,000 raise for her. The other players, aware of Ballinger's tightfisted, cautious nature, all reluctantly fold. Mary collects her sizable winnings and pays Ballinger back with interest. The game then breaks up, no one ever having seen the winning hand.

The lady's determination earns her the admiration of the men. Drummond is so touched that when he returns home to the waiting wedding ceremony, he talks privately to his weak-willed, prospective son-in-law, gives him some money, and orders him to run away and find himself a better wife than his daughter.

In the end, Meredith, Mary, and even their "son" are revealed to be confidence tricksters and expert card sharps. With the help of Scully—who dreams of romance far from the tedium and poverty of a country doctor's life—and at Ballinger's behest, they have perpetrated a scam on the other poker players, who had swindled the banker in a real-estate deal 16 years before. "Mary" is actually Ballinger's mistress, Ruby. She promised him she would give up gambling after the caper, but she sits down to another poker game, much to Ballinger's dismay, as the credits roll.

Cast

 Henry Fonda as Meredith/Benny
 Joanne Woodward as Mary/Ruby
 Jason Robards as Henry P.G. Drummond
 Paul Ford as C.P. Ballinger
 Charles Bickford as Benson Tropp
 Burgess Meredith as Doc Joseph Scully
 Kevin McCarthy as Otto Habershaw
 Robert Middleton as Dennis Wilcox
 John Qualen as Jesse Buford
 Percy Helton as Kevin McKenzie 
 Gerald Michenaud as Jackie
 James Kinney as Sam Rhine
 Allen Collins as Toby
 Jim Boles as Pete
 Virginia Gregg as Mrs. Drummond
 Chester Conklin as Old Man In Saloon
 Mae Clarke as Mrs. Craig
 Ned Glass as Owney Price
 James Griffith as Mr. Stribling
 Noah Keen as Sparrow

Nominations
Joanne Woodward was nominated for the Golden Laurel Award for Female Comedy Performance.

Reception
The New York Times' Robert Alden enjoyed the film, praising the “seasoned set of actors” in the cast: “They are a skillful bunch, and it is a pleasure seeing real film professionals having at each other. A foxier bunch of artful poker rascals would be hard to find” crediting Meredith with “perhaps the most memorable performance of the lot.”   Observing that “Lee Garmes, (is) one of the master camera hands of the West, and the roving camera eye of Mr. Garmes and company provides some of the film's best moments,” Alden adds “the mixing of comedy and tragedy is sometimes uncomfortable for an audience” seeing it for the first time. However, the “delightful surprise ending” ...”makes the feast worthwhile. “

See also
 List of American films of 1966

References

External links
 
 
 
 
 

1966 films
1966 Western (genre) films
American Western (genre) films
1960s English-language films
Films about con artists
Films directed by Fielder Cook
Films scored by David Raksin
Films set in Texas
Films about poker
Warner Bros. films
Films based on television plays
1960s American films